Alexander Baumgärtel (born 28 September 1972) is a German speed skater. He competed at the 1994 Winter Olympics and the 1998 Winter Olympics.

References

External links
 

1972 births
Living people
German male speed skaters
Olympic speed skaters of Germany
Speed skaters at the 1994 Winter Olympics
Speed skaters at the 1998 Winter Olympics
Sportspeople from Saint Petersburg